Gennady Tkachenko-Papizh (Russian Cyrillic: Геннадий Ткаченко-Папиж, born 27 January 1964) is a Russian singer who has gained attention on the Georgia's Got Talent television show. His vocalizations sometimes mimic natural sound and have been described as ethereal, surreal, and organic.

Early life and education 
Tkachenko-Papizh was born in Russia. As a child he played the guitar and the ukulele. 

He studied at the Kyiv Municipal Academy of Variety and Circus Arts before returning to Russia. In 1996, after some work, he returned to his education and studied at the Russian State Institute of Performing Arts until 2000.

Career 
Tkachenko-Papizh has worked as a singer, comedian and a mime in Russia, Georgia, Germany, and the United States. He has performed on the television show Georgia's Got Talent.

After graduation, and until 1989, he worked in the Buff Theatre in the Russian city of Neva. From 1996 until 1998, he worked at the Saint Petersburg Comedy Theatre. After leaving the theatre, he co-founded the Papizh-Club Theater with G. Gubanova. After that, he moved to Berlin.

In 2018 he played the role of Chronos in the stage production Маша и Медведь + Три богатыря (English: Masha and the Bear + Three heroes) at Crocus City Hall.

Critical reception 
His musical style was described by one commentator as "extraterrestrial".

Personal life 
Tkachenko-Papizh is married and has three children. In 2016, he lived in Berlin.

References

External links 

 Gennady Tkachenko-Papizh - YouTube
 Gennady Tkachenko-Papizh - Instagram

Contestants on British game shows
Experimental musicians
Russian singers
Russian emigrants to Germany
Russian mimes
Russian comedians
Comedians from Berlin
Singers from Berlin
Russian State Institute of Performing Arts alumni